Agni Shikha ( Flames of Fire) is a 1999 film directed by Sujit Guha and produced by Binu Sengupta & Damini Naidu.

Plot
Abhi hates his father since he believes that the man left his mother to marry a rich girl. He eventually begins to destroy his father's business empire, not knowing that the latter is also remorseful.

Cast
Prosenjit Chatterjee as Abhimanyu roy
Ronit Roy as Prodipta Roy
Rituparna Sengupta as chondra singh
Anuradha roy as Abhi's Mother
Subhendu Chatterjee as Arjun's Father

References

External links
 Agni shikha (1999) in Gomolo

Bengali-language Indian films
1999 films
1990s Bengali-language films